Hong Sung-wook (born 17 September 2002) is a South Korean footballer currently playing as a centre back for K League 1 club Jeju United.

Career statistics

Club

Notes

References

2002 births
Living people
South Korean footballers
South Korea youth international footballers
Association football defenders
Jeju United FC players
Hong Sung-wook